These are the full results of the 2008 South American Under-23 Championships in Athletics which took place between September 5 and September 7, 2008, at Villa Deportiva Nacional (VIDENA) in Lima, Peru.

Men's results

100 meters

Heat 1 – 5 September 16:00h
Wind: -0.6 m/s

Heat 2 – 5 September 16:00h
Wind: +0.0 m/s

Final – 6 September 9:55h
Wind: -2.0 m/s

200 meters
Final – 7 September 14:10h
Wind: -1.0 m/s

400 meters

Heat 1 – 5 September 16:40h

Heat 2 – 5 September 16:40h

Final – 6 September 10:15h

800 meters
Final – 7 September 14:30h

1500 meters
Final – 5 September 17:00h

5000 meters
Final – 7 September 15:00h

10,000 meters
Final – 6 September 11:00h

3000 meters steeplechase
Final – 6 September 15:40h

110 meters hurdles
Final – 6 September 9:30h
Wind: -2.5 m/s

400 meters hurdles
Final – 7 September 10:45h

High jump
Final – 6 September 9:00h

Pole vault
Final – 7 September 9:00h

Long jump
Final – 7 September 11:00h

Triple jump
Final – 6 September 11:00h

Shot put
Final – 6 September 9:00h

Discus throw
Final – 7 September 11:00h

Hammer throw
Final – 5 September 14:50h

Javelin throw
Final – 6 September 9:00h

Decathlon
Final – 7 September 9:00h

20,000 meters walk
Final – 7 September 7:00h

4x100 meters relay
Final – 6 September 17:00h

4x400 meters relay
Final – 7 September 15:50h

Women's results

100 meters
Final – 6 September 9:45h
Wind: -2.5 m/s

200 meters
Final – 7 September 14:00h
Wind: -1.2 m/s

400 meters
Final – 6 September 10:05h

800 meters
Final – 7 September 14:20h

1500 meters
Final – 6 September 10:25h

5000 meters
Final – 5 September 17:20h

10,000 meters
Final – 7 September 9:20h

3000 meters steeplechase
Final – 6 September 15:20h

100 meters hurdles
Final – 6 September 9:20h
Wind: -2.1 m/s

400 meters hurdles
Final – 7 September 10:30h

High jump
Final – 7 September 10:45h

Pole vault
Final – 5 September 14:40h

Long jump
Final – 7 September 9:00h

Triple jump
Final – 7 September 14:30h

Shot put
Final – 7 September 14:30h

Discus throw
Final – 6 September 14:30h

Hammer throw
Final – 6 September 11:00h

Javelin throw
Final – 5 September 16:30h

20,000 meters walk
Final – 6 September 0:00h

Heptathlon
Final – 6 September 0:00h

4x100 meters relay
Final – 6 September 16:40h

4x400 meters relay
Final – 7 September 15:30h

Note
The names of the Brazilian athletes were completed using the published list of participants.

References

South American U23
Events at the South American Under-23 Championships in Athletics